The 1981 U.S. Pro Indoor was a men's tennis tournament played on indoor carpet courts. It was a WCT tournament that was part of the 1981 Volvo Grand Prix circuit. The tournament was played at the Spectrum in Philadelphia, Pennsylvania in the United States and was held from January 26 through February 1, 1981. Seventh-seeded Roscoe Tanner won the singles title.

Finals

Singles

 Roscoe Tanner defeated  Wojciech Fibak 6–2, 7–6, 7–5
 It was Tanner's only title of the year and the 29th of his career.

Doubles

 Marty Riessen /  Sherwood Stewart defeated  Brian Gottfried /  Raúl Ramírez 6–2, 6–2
 It was Riessen's only title of the year and the 59th of his career. It was Stewart's 1st title of the year and the 30th of his career.

References

External links
 ITF tournament edition details

U.S. Pro Indoor
U.S. Pro Indoor
U.S. Professional Indoor
U.S. Professional Indoor
U.S. Professional Indoor
U.S. Professional Indoor